Knowl Hill is a village in the civil parish of Hurley  in Berkshire, England. In the eighteenth and nineteenth centuries it was the southern terminus of the Hatfield and Reading Turnpike that allowed travelers from the north to continue their journey to the west without going through the congestion of London.

The village has a Church of England parish church, a primary school, a café and a tool shop. It has three pubs: the Bird in Hand, the New Inn and the Royal Oak. A fourth pub, the Seven Stars, a Grade II listed building, ceased trading in 2012 and has been converted into domestic accommodation.

St Peter's parish church was designed by JC and G Buckler and built in 1840. Its chancel was designed by W Scott Champion and added in 1870.

On the south side of the A4 is Knowl Hill Common, a hill with a view toward Windsor Castle which can be seen on a clear day. Also on the south side is a small wood called The Clumps, the name being derived from two separate groups of trees that were once significantly taller than the rest and clumped in the middle.

Knowl Hill Steam Rally
Knowl Hill Steam Rally was an internationally known event that was held every August. It was last held in 2004, after which it was discontinued due to increasing insurance premiums.

References

External links

 Wargrave with Knowl Hill Church of England parish website

Villages in Berkshire
Hurley, Berkshire